Ambia magnificalis is a moth in the family Crambidae. It was described by Charles Swinhoe in 1895. It is found in India.

References

Moths described in 1895
Musotiminae
Moths of Asia